Maclear, officially Nqanqarhu, is a small town situated in the Eastern Cape province of South Africa, near the Mooi River (a tributary of the Tsitsa River),  north of East London and  northeast of Elliot. 

It lies just north-east of Ugie. The land to the east and south was part of the former homeland of Transkei.

History
It was founded in 1876 as a military camp, called Nqanqaru Drift and developed rapidly, reaching municipal status in 1916. It is named after Sir Thomas Maclear (1794-1879), a famous astronomer who laid the foundation for a trigonometrical survey of the Cape Colony.

In 2021, the town was renamed Nqanqarhu.

Tourism
Maclear is a trout-fishing resort.

Geographic location
Maclear lies between Mount Fletcher and Ugie, in the foothills of the Drakensberg mountains, and at the intersection between the R56 and R396 roads.

References

Populated places in the Elundini Local Municipality